My Man: Live at Montmartre 1973 is a live album by American saxophonist Ben Webster recorded at the Jazzhus Montmartre in 1973 and released on the SteepleChase label.

Reception
The Allmusic review by Scott Yanow awarded the album 3 stars and stated "Just months before his death, the great tenor Ben Webster shows that even with an occasional shortness of breath, he never really declined musically. ...Webster's warm ballad renditions and hard-driving romps are as always quite enjoyable to hear.".

Track listing
 "Sunday" (Chester Conn, Benny Krueger, Ned Miller, Jule Styne) - 7:55		
 "Willow Weep for Me" (Ann Ronell) - 8:56		
 "Exactly Like You" (Dorothy Fields, Jimmy McHugh) - 8:44		
 "Old Folks" (Dedette Lee Hill, Willard Robison) - 10:06		
 "I Got Rhythm" (George Gershwin, Ira Gershwin) - 8:00		
 "Set Call" (Ben Webster) - 8:06

Personnel
Ben Webster – tenor saxophone
Ole Kock Hansen – piano
Bo Stief – bass
Alex Riel – drums

References

SteepleChase Records live albums
Ben Webster live albums
1974 live albums